The Hinterrhein (German; Italian: Reno Posteriore; Sutsilvan: Ragn Posteriur; Sursilvan: Rein Posteriur; Rumantsch Grischun, Vallader, and Puter: Rain Posteriur; Surmiran: Ragn posteriour) is one of the two initial tributaries of the Rhine (shorter in length but bigger by volume) rising in the canton of Graubünden in Switzerland.

Course
Flowing from the village Hinterrhein near the San Bernardino Pass through the Rheinwald valley, the river flows into a gorge called Roflaschlucht. In this gorge an equally sized tributary, the Avers Rhine, adds waters from the deep Val Ferrera and the very remote alp Avers and its side valley Valle di Lei on Italian territory. After the Rofla Gorge, the valley widens into a section called Schams. The Hinterrhein then reaches Andeer, before passing through another gorge, Viamala just before Thusis. Now another tributary of slightly bigger volume reaches the Hinterrhein as the Landwasser, draining a system of valleys, which is commonly known as Davos joins via the Albula coming from the Albula Pass, which is also the name of a railway line that has become a UNESCO world heritage. Another big tributary of Albula river is Gelgia from the Julier pass area. After flowing to Rothenbrunnen through a valley called Domleschg (a valley with an incredible number of castles, showing the importance of transit in the area) the river is again left alone from civilisation in the floodplain Isla Bella near Rhäzüns, before it joins the Anterior Rhine at Reichenau.

Significance
To learn about the importance of travel along the Hinterrhein, a multiday trekking route is signposted along the river from Thusis to Splügen, where it turns south to Splügen Pass, a historically important transit route to Italy. Nowadays there is no traffic across the Splügen pass in winter, whereas the route across its age-old rival, the San Bernardino Pass, was given a long road tunnel in 1967 that made it possible to keep the road open all year.

References 

Rivers of Switzerland
 
Rivers of Graubünden
Andeer
Rheinwald
Schams
Sufers
Zillis-Reischen
Rongellen
Sils im Domleschg
Thusis
Fürstenau, Switzerland
Cazis
Domleschg
Rothenbrunnen
Rhäzüns
Domat/Ems
Bonaduz